Dinamo Minsk may refer to:

FC Dinamo Minsk - Minsk football club
HC Dinamo Minsk - Minsk ice hockey club
HC Dinamo Minsk (handball) - Minsk handball club
Tivali Minsk, a hockey team known as Dynamo Minsk (1977-1993)